Hiram Stevens may refer to:
Hiram F. Stevens (1852–1904), American academic
Hiram Sanford Stevens (1832–1893), Delegate to the U.S. House of Representatives from Arizona Territory (1875–9)